Glinton may refer to:

Glinton, Cambridgeshire

People with the surname
 Duane Glinton
 Gavin Glinton

See also
Clinton (surname)
Clinton (disambiguation)